HelpAge India is an Indian organization focused on the concerns of elders and supports geriatric initiatives. Established in 1978, its mission is “to work for the cause and care of disadvantaged older persons and to improve their quality of life”. HELP AGE advocates for their needs such as, for Universal Pension, quality healthcare, action against Elder Abuse and many more at the national, state and societal level, with the Central and State governments. It runs various Agecare programs to service elder needs. The aim is to serve disadvantaged elders in a holistic manner, enabling them to live active, dignified and healthier lives.

History

HelpAge India began in the late 1960s when the speaker of the Lok Sabha visited his counterpart in the House of Commons of the United Kingdom, who was also honorary secretary of Help the Aged. He came back with a vision of setting up something similar in India.

In March 1974, when Jackson Cole, founder of HelpAge International visited India, Samson Daniel, a philanthropist, approached him for financial help to set up a member organisation in Delhi. Cole instead offered to train him to raise funds. After a three-month training course in London, Daniel and his wife returned to India and organised a sponsored walk with schoolchildren in Delhi. It was so successful that in 1975 HelpAge International recruited more staff to cover Bombay, Madras and Calcutta.

HelpAge India is one of the founding members of HelpAge International, a high-profile body having 97 member countries representing the cause of the elderly at the United Nations. It is closely associated with Help the Aged, UK and has received a special testimonial from the United Nations for "Dedicated service in support of the United Nations Programme on Ageing".
HelpAge India is also a full member of the International Federation on Ageing.

In April 1978, HelpAge India was registered in Delhi. Within three months it became autonomous as financial support ceased from UK. Soon after, in July, the society was awarded Certificates of Exemption under Sections 12A and 80G of the Income Tax Act, 1961.

In the year 2020, HelpAge India received the UN Population Award for the care of elderly disadvantaged persons and senior citizens, a first for an NGO institution in India,in recognition of its work on population issues and efforts in the realisation of rights of older persons in India since its inception. The award was presented to mark the Human Rights Day,at a virtual event held at UN headquarters in New York. JRD Tata was the last Indian individual laureate to be conferred with this award about 28 years ago in the year 1992.

The award highlights the issue of ageing with India being a place for an estimated 140 million elderly and with 42 years of field work with presence in 125 districts across 25 states.

Approach
HelpAge India works in the following areas:
 Elderly rights - Elder Abuse in India, Reverse Mortgage, Senior Citizens Associations (SCAs), Ending Isolation, Health Insurance, Parents Maintenance Act, Union Budget Allocation, National Policy on Older Persons
 Eldercare - Healthcare, Social Protection, Shelters, Specialized Care
 Supporters - Individual Volunteering, Corporates & Business houses, Trusts & Foundations, Bi-Lateral & Multi-Lateral Funders

Programs

HelpAge India runs various programs servicing the needs of disadvantaged elderly mentioned here below:

Mobile Healthcare Units (MHU): This program seeks to provide healthcare to elders and their communities. The core of the program is a sponsored Mobile Healthcare Unit (MHU). This Unit provides primary healthcare to the needy elderly, while simultaneously educates the community on preventive healthcare. Each MHU has a doctor, pharmacist and a social worker. There are more than 159 Mobile Healthcare Units working in 24 states, providing 2.9 million free treatments. The organisation also helps elders become self-reliant and independent through the formation of Elder-Self-Help-Groups in rural India which supports 95,584 older persons through 7415 Elder-Self-Help Groups in 16 States.

Restoration of Vision: In India 62% elderly suffer from cataract blindness. Credible and competent eye hospitals are selected for carrying out surgeries with HelpAge India's support-a-Gran ration program and provides Homecare support to bed ridden patients. All surgeries are performed only in base hospitals and not in makeshift camps. Since 1980, this program has benefitted more than 9 lakh elders, restoring their sight & dignity.

Cancer and Palliative Care: Cancer treatment in our country is highly priced and majority of elders are not covered by any form of medical insurance. HelpAge India provides palliative care to end- stage cancer patients, in partnership with a number of credible and competent cancer hospitals and organisations. Over 99,000 treatments have been supported since 1998.

Geriatric Physiotherapy: Under this program, elders with musculoskeletal diseases such as back pain, arthritis, paralysis and other age related mobility challenges are treated. The aim is to enable elder mobility levels and make daily living easier. The services are provided through stationary physiotherapy clinics and mobile services, to elders living in remote communities and homes for the aged.

 Student Action for Value Education (SAVE) - To address the increasing gap between generations and sensitize the young towards elders, HelpAge works hand-in-hand with schools across the country to inculcate values of care, love and respect towards the elderly, in young students so they grow to become responsible and caring individuals and are sensitive to the needs of the older generation. The organisation also runs a school advocacy program sensitizing young children towards elder needs and urging them to treat elders with love,care and respect.

Digital Literacy for Elders: The increasing pace of change in technology often excludes elders from the mainstream social fabric. To tackle this, HelpAge has started an easy 'Digital Literacy' program introducing elders to the online world through Digital Literacy workshops so that they can lead and active lives. Partner institutions, organizations and volunteers are encouraged to conduct basic tutorials for elders, using the HelpAge Handbook for senior citizens – Computers and Smart Phones learning made easy.

Awards and recognition
Madan Mohan Sabharwal, former President Emeritus of HelpAge India is a recipient of the Order of the British Empire (1998) and Padma Shri (2008).

References

Organisations based in Delhi
Non-profit organisations based in India
Organizations established in 1978
Charities for the elderly
Old age in India
1978 establishments in Delhi